"The Kekulé Problem" is a 2017 nonfiction essay by writer Cormac McCarthy for the Santa Fe Institute. It was his first published work of nonfiction. It was published April 20, 2017 in the scientific magazine Nautilus. The illustrations were created by Don Kilpatrick III.

Subject
McCarthy analyzes a dream of August Kekulé's as a model of the unconscious mind and the origins of language. He theorizes about the nature of the unconscious mind and its separation from human language. The unconscious, according to McCarthy, "is a machine for operating an animal" and that "all animals have an unconscious." McCarthy goes on to postulate that language is purely a human cultural creation, and not a biologically determined phenomenon.

Reception
The article was praised by Nick Romeo of The New Yorker.

References

External links
 Full text

2017 essays
Kekulé Problem, The